Yeisser Ramirez (born November 5, 1986) is a Cuban-American épée  fencer.

Biography 
Ramirez was born in Cuba to Idalmis Ferrer and Francisco Ramirez. He learned to fence épée barefoot in Guantánamo Bay. Ramirez immigrated to the U.S. in 2007 at 21 years old, after being drawn to receive an American visa in a Cuban lottery program. He represented Team USA at the Senior World Championships in 2015.

Ramirez represented Team USA in the 2020 Tokyo Olympics.

Career highlights 

2012 Division 1 Men's Épée National Championships, 2nd (individual)
2013 Division 1 Men's Épée National Championships, 3rd (individual)
2015 Pan American Championships, 12th (individual)
2020 Tokyo Olympics (individual & team)

References 

1986 births
Living people
American male épée fencers
Fencers at the 2020 Summer Olympics
Olympic fencers of the United States
Pan American Games silver medalists for the United States
Pan American Games medalists in fencing
Fencers at the 2015 Pan American Games
Medalists at the 2015 Pan American Games